Hydroxybenzaldehydes are phenolic aldehydes. The term may refer to:

 Salicylaldehyde (2-hydroxybenzaldehyde)
 3-Hydroxybenzaldehyde
 4-Hydroxybenzaldehyde